Ben Lewin (born 1946) is an Australian director.

Early life and education 
Ben Lewin was born in Poland.  As a child, he emigrated with his family to Melbourne, Australia. At the age of six, he contracted polio which has caused him to use crutches for the rest of his life. Lewin attended the University of Melbourne where he studied law.  In 1971, he left his job as a barrister in Australia after being given a scholarship to study film at National Film and Television School in England.  After school, Lewin remained in England where he worked in television.

Work in film
Lewin has since made feature films in Australia, England, France, and America.  Some of his notable films are The Dunera Boys (1985), Georgia (1988), The Favour, the Watch and the Very Big Fish (1991), and The Sessions (2012), for which he also wrote the screenplay, based on an essay by Mark O'Brien.

He also directed the films Please Stand By (2017),  The Catcher Was a Spy (2018) and Falling for Figaro (2021).

References

External links
 

1946 births
Australian Jews
Australian people of Polish-Jewish descent
Polish emigrants to Australia
American film directors
Australian film directors
Living people
Melbourne Law School alumni
People from Melbourne
Polish emigrants to the United Kingdom
Australian emigrants to England
Alumni of the National Film and Television School